California's 31st district may refer to:

 California's 31st congressional district
 California's 31st State Assembly district
 California's 31st State Senate district